Black literature is literature created by or for Black people. For more, see:
 African literature
 African-American literature
 Afro-Brazilian literature
 Black British#Writers
 Black Canadians#Culture
 Caribbean literature
 Haitian literature

See also 
 Black art (disambiguation)
 Négritude
 :Category:African diaspora literature